The Crown 23 is a Canadian sailboat, that was designed by C. William Lapworth and first built in 1969.

The Crown 23 design was renamed the Calgan 23 in 1970.

The Crown 23 is thought to be a development of the slightly larger Cal 24-2, as Calgan Marine produced several other Cal Yachts designs under licence.

Production
The boat was built by Calgan Marine in Canada and named for the street on which the factory was located, Crown Street in North Vancouver, BC. The design is now out of production.

Design
The Crown 23 is a small recreational keelboat, built predominantly of fiberglass, with wood trim. It has a masthead sloop rig, an internally-mounted spade-type rudder and a fixed fin keel. It displaces  and carries  of ballast.

The Crown 23 is normally fitted with a small outboard motor for docking and maneuvering.

See also
List of sailing boat types

Similar sailboats
Beneteau First 235
O'Day 23
Paceship 23
Paceship PY 23
Precision 23
Rob Roy 23
Sonic 23

References

Keelboats
1960s sailboat type designs
Sailing yachts
Sailboat type designs by Bill Lapworth
Sailboat types built by Calgan Marine